Indian bagpipe may refer to:

Mashak, a bagpipe found in Northern India and Pakistan
The Great Highland Bagpipe, played in some parts of India for ceremonies due to retention of some British military traditions
Titti (bagpipe), a bagpipe played in Andhra Pradesh
Sruti upanga, a bagpipe of Tamil Nadu